In the history of Baghdad, the period from 1831 to 1917 began with the fall of the Mamluk dynasty in 1831 after the Ottoman Empire occupied the city. It ended with the Fall of Baghdad on 11 March 1917 after the British Empire occupied the city during the First World War. Ali Rıza Pasha was a first Ottoman Governor of Baghdad, and Khalil Pasha was the last.

Timeline
 1832 – The uprising of Abdul Ghani Al-Jameel against Ottoman Governor Ali Reza Pasha failed.
 1845 – A plague was spreading in Baghdad .
 1853 – Baháʼu'lláh and his family arrived in Baghdad coming from Iran on 8 April, where he stayed for 10 years.
 1854 – The Islamic scholar Mahmud al-Alusi dies.
 1864 – An earthquake happened in Baghdad on 7 December.
 1869 – Midhat Pasha is now in power .
 1870
 Municipal council established.
 City walls demolished.
 1871 – Population: 65,000.
 1879 – Many Kurds come to Baghdad after a major famine had spread in the Kurdistan region, and this year people from Baghdad knew it would be Bersima year for the city.
 1895 
 Population: 100,000 (estimate) .
 Two Earthquakes happened in Baghdad on 25 November .
 1897 – The Governor of Baghdad Atteallah Pasha Kawakeby opened the Al-Khar Bridge (Al-Hamidiyah)
 1908 – Population: 140,000 (estimate).
 1909 – Cinema built.
 1911 – Ottoman XIII Corps headquartered in Baghdad.
 1912 – Population: 200,000 (estimate).
 1914 – October: Samarra-Baghdad railway begins operating.
 1915
 Istanbul-Baghdad railway begins operating.
Al Rasheed Street laid out.
 Cholera epidemic.
 1917
 March: Fall of Baghdad (1917); British in power.
 Cinema opens.

Ottoman walis (1831–1917)

See also
 History of Baghdad 1638 -1704
 History of Baghdad
 Baghdad

Notes

References

 1831
Baghdad vilayet